Divan Japonais is a lithograph poster by French artist Henri de Toulouse-Lautrec. It was created to advertise a café-chantant that was at the time known as Divan Japonais. The poster depicts three persons from the Montmartre of Toulouse-Lautrec's time. Dancer Jane Avril is in the audience. Beside her is writer Édouard Dujardin. They are watching a performance by Yvette Guilbert. Though her face is not included in the poster, she is recognizable by her tall, thin frame and long black gloves.

References

Paintings by Henri de Toulouse-Lautrec
Lithographs